Mattias Mainiero (born 6 June 1955) is an Italian journalist and editor in chief.

Biography
Mainiero was born in Torre del Greco, Naples, Italy. He started his career as journalist in 1979, writing for the newspaper Vita. In 1981 he moved to the Giornale d'Italia. In 1984 Mainiero agreed to become editor of Giornale d'Italia end after of Fiorino. He was editor until 1987. After, he contributed to other newspapers and magazines, like Il Borghese and Il Messaggero. In 2000, he passed to the right-wing newspaper Libero. He wrote L'Italia racconta  e Scritti pirati. For Libero and Libero online  he writes the daily newspaper column A tu per tu.

References

1955 births
Living people
Journalists from Naples